Dabrava Glacier is the 14 km long and 4.5 km wide glacier on Pernik Peninsula, Loubet Coast in Graham Land, Antarctica, situated southwest of Murphy Glacier and north of Sölch Glacier.  It drains the west slopes of Mount Deeley, flows northwestwards and enters Lallemand Fjord southwest of Orford Cliff.

The glacier is named after the settlements of Dabrava in Northern, Northeastern, Southern and Southwestern Bulgaria.

Location
British mapping in 1976 and 1978.

Maps
 Antarctic Digital Database (ADD). Scale 1:250000 topographic map of Antarctica. Scientific Committee on Antarctic Research (SCAR). Since 1993, regularly upgraded and updated.
British Antarctic Territory. Scale 1:200000 topographic map. DOS 610 Series, Sheet W 66 66. Directorate of Overseas Surveys, Tolworth, UK, 1976.
British Antarctic Territory. Scale 1:200000 topographic map. DOS 610 Series, Sheet W 67 66. Directorate of Overseas Surveys, Tolworth, UK, 1978.

References
 Bulgarian Antarctic Gazetteer. Antarctic Place-names Commission. (details in Bulgarian, basic data in English)
 Dabrava Glacier. SCAR Composite Antarctic Gazetteer.

External links
 Dabrava Glacier. Copernix satellite image

Bulgaria and the Antarctic
Glaciers of Loubet Coast